Qaṭari ibn al-Fujaʾa (died c. 698–699 CE) was a Kharjite leader and poet. Born in Al Khuwayr, he ruled over the Azariqa faction of the Kharjites for more than ten years after the death of Nafi ibn al-Azraq in c. 685 CE. He led an uprising against the Umayyad Caliphate for more than 20 years.

Ibn Khallikan, a 13th-century Muslim scholar, states that 'Qatari' is not his given name, but instead refers to the name of the region where he hailed from. A member of the Banu Tamim tribe, he held the title of Amir al-Mu'minin, which translates to 'leader of the faithful' and was the formal title of the Caliphs. His nicknames were Na'ama (ostrich) and Abu al-Mawt (father of death). It has been asserted that he was the first Khawarji leader to promote jihadism, as his poems glorified courage, death and war in the name of Allah.

He minted the first known Kharijite coins, the earliest of which dated to 688 or 689. It was minted in the Arab-Sasanian style. The coin bore the Pahlavi inscription "‛Abdallah Qatari, the Commander of the Faithful, who has increased the royal glory".

Role in Azariqa faction
In 687, Ibn al-Fuja'a assumed leadership over the Azariqa sub-sect of the Khawarij sect of Islam during the Second Fitna. Leading his troops from Kerman, he recaptured portions of Ahvaz and marched towards Basra.

Around 698 or 699, the governor of Iraq al-Hajjaj ibn Yusuf sent two of his generals, al-Muhallab ibn Abi Sufra and Sufyan ibn al-Abrad al-Kalbi, to attack Ibn al-Fuja'a and his men who were encamped in Tabaristan. After fleeing to Semnan, Ibn al-Fuja'a was confronted by Sufyan's forces. Ibn al Fuja'a's forces were defeated and he was decapitated in the encounter. Shortly after the battle, the remnants of the Azariqa faction met their demise under the leadership of 'Abida ibn Hilal, marking the end of the Islamic sub-sect.

References

Further reading

External links
Qatari ibn al-Fuja'a on Oxford Database of Arabic Literature

7th-century Arabs
Kharijites
Islamic religious leaders
People executed by the Umayyad Caliphate
Rebellions against the Umayyad Caliphate
7th-century executions by the Umayyad Caliphate
7th-century Arabic poets
Year of birth uncertain